Nectamia fusca, commonly known as ghost cardinalfish, is a marine fish native to the Indian and Pacific Oceans.

References

Fish described in 1825
Fish of Thailand
Fish of Japan
Fish of the Pacific Ocean
Fish of the Indian Ocean
fusca